Coleophora mediae is a moth of the family Coleophoridae.

References

mediae
Moths described in 1990